PitchCom is a wireless communication system used in baseball to allow the catcher to request pitches without using visible signals. Major League Baseball (MLB) approved the use of PitchCom before the start of the 2022 season with the intentions of deterring sign stealing and quickening the pace of play.

History

Traditionally, catchers have requested pitches using visible signals, typically by sequences of finger gestures. This has been prone to sign stealing, where a member of the batting team recognizes the signals and relays them to the batter. When a runner is on second base, the catcher commonly visits the pitcher to change signs, delaying the game.

PitchCom was invented by John Hankins and Craig Filcetti. The technology was originally developed to provide cues for magic shows. The company asked MLB to consider adopting their technology in 2020.  During the 2021 Low-A West season, teams were permitted to try PitchCom. The technology was optional but strongly encouraged, according to a memo sent by the league. After generally positive results in the minor league, and in spring training before the 2022 MLB season, the MLB Players Association approved use of PitchCom for the 2022 season.

During spring training before the 2023 MLB season, MLB will test an expansion of PitchCom. The league will allow pitchers to wear PitchCom wristbands so they can call their own pitches.

Operation
PitchCom has two functional components: a nine-button keypad that the catcher wears and small wireless receivers, with speakers, that the catcher, the pitcher, and up to three other fielders may wear inside their baseball caps. Each receiver can be programmed to a particular spoken language. When the catcher presses buttons to indicate the type of pitch and the desired location, all receivers speak the instructions in the selected language. All communications are encrypted and teams may opt to replace pitch names such as "fastball" with code words.

During its first season of use in MLB, some players had problems using PitchCom. Early in the 2022 season, New York Yankees pitcher Aroldis Chapman had difficulty hearing PitchCom over the crowd during an appearance at Oriole Park at Camden Yards. "We just might have to turn up our volume a little bit," said Jose Trevino, the Yankees' catcher. Gerrit Cole, another Yankees pitcher, had trouble hearing pitch instructions in his first two starts, including an incident where the instructions were drowned out by a siren sound effect that the Yankee Stadium audio crew plays to energize the crowd. During a game on June 30 against the Houston Astros, Yankees pitcher Luis Severino was trying to fix his malfunctioning PitchCom device when Kyle Tucker, on third base, tried to steal home. Severino, despite the distraction, threw out Tucker at home. On Opening Day, Milwaukee Brewers pitcher Corbin Burnes had problems hearing his PitchCom speaker over the crowd noise at American Family Field. As of April 24, Burnes was the only Brewers pitcher regularly using PitchCom; other pitchers had stopped using it, saying that they were not yet comfortable using the technology with their catchers.

During the 2022 season, in response to complaints, PitchCom was modified to have a higher volume limit and to have an extension tube that put sound closer to the player's ear. Even at the higher maximum volume, during the 2022 MLB postseason, Philadelphia Phillies shortstop Bryson Stott struggled to hear the audio over the crowd noise. During a spring training game before the 2023 season, umpires informed Minnesota Twins manager Rocco Baldelli that Tampa Bay Rays batters and umpires could clearly hear Twins pitcher Kenta Maeda's PitchCom signals because Twins catcher Tony Wolters had his speaker volume turned up to an excessively high level, and because the announced crowd of 2,531 at Tropicana Field was quiet.

Reception

Despite early problems, all 30 MLB clubs had started to use PitchCom in some way during the 2022 season. Catcher Tucker Barnhart of the Detroit Tigers said that the technology would make the Tigers ready for the pitch clock when MLB starts to use it. The Cleveland Guardians' manager Terry Francona and catcher Austin Hedges said that the technology sped up games noticeably. Aaron Boone, manager of the Yankees, credits PitchCom with significant speed-ups in Yankees games during the 2022 season. Through their first 54 games in 2022, the Yankees played 25 games (about 47%) in less than three hours. In 2021, only about 25% of the Yankees' games finished in three hours or less. Across all MLB teams, the average time of a nine-inning game in 2022 decreased by six minutes compared with the prior season, which ESPN credited in part to PitchCom.

New York Mets pitcher Max Scherzer used PitchCom for the first time on July 27, 2022, in a game against the Yankees in which he pitched 7 innings without conceding any runs. Scherzer praised PitchCom's functionality, but he told reporters that "it should be illegal," saying that it removes incentives for pitchers to create complex visual sign systems that runners are challenged to decode. "It works," said Scherzer about PitchCom, "but it’s taking away a part of the game." Scherzer's comments drew rebuttals from Seattle Mariners relief pitcher Paul Sewald, who called them "a little naïve" and "a bit hypocritical", and from Minnesota Twins starter Sonny Gray, who observed that teams were able to break down sign sequences during a game.

References

External links
 

Major League Baseball
Wireless communication systems